The Oakville Rock Senior B are a Canadian Senior box lacrosse team. The team plays in the City of Oakville, Ontario, Canada and participate in Ontario Series Lacrosse.

History
Established in 2006 as the Wellington Aces, the team was rebranded as Wellington Dufferins for the 2009 season. After two seasons the team was again renamed - now as Wellington Dufferin Titans.  

In 2012, the club relocated to Oakville and became the Oakville Titans. In that season, the Titans finished second in the regular season, but lost in the semi-finals to an experienced Owen Sound Woodsmen squad.  

The 2013 season was a challenging one for the program and marked the only time the team has missed the playoffs.  

The team had back to back semi-final finishes in 2014 and 2015.  

In 2015, the Titans relocated to the Toronto Rock Athletic Centre for their home games and became the only team in the league to play on turf.  

After finishing third in the league in 2017 and a disappointing semi-final loss, the Titans made some key off season pickups and won their first Ontario championship in 2018. The Titans advanced to the Presidents' Cup where they would finish 5-3 in the round robin before losing the bronze medal game to Caughnawaga Indians 15–6.  

Ownership and management changes prior to the 2022 season had the team rebranded as the Oakville Rock Senior B.

Season-by-season results

Presidents Cup results

See also
OLA Senior B Lacrosse League
Presidents Cup (box lacrosse)

References

External links
Ontario Series Lacrosse

Ontario Lacrosse Association teams
Lacrosse teams in Ontario
Oakville, Ontario